Oxford Street is located in the City of Gloucester, England. It runs between London Road in the south and Oxford Road in the north. It was developed as uniform stuccoed terraces by the attorney John Bowyer on a plot that he had bought in 1823.

Oxford Street is the location of a number of listed buildings:

1a-11, 15 and 17, Oxford Street
29 and 31, Oxford Street
The Victoria Inn (1823–25)
2 to 20, Oxford Street

See also
 Clapham
 Worcester Street

References

External links 

Streets in Gloucester